Joseph E. Brooks (born February 24, 1942) is an American politician, journalist and social service agency director from Maine. An Unenrolled (independent) member of the Maine House of Representatives, Brooks represented a portion of rural Waldo County including his residence in Winterport, Maine. He served in the Maine House previously from 1996 to 2002.

Brooks is originally from Brewer, Maine and graduated from John Bapst Memorial High School in Bangor, Maine. Brooks served in the Army National Guard from 1959 to 1972. He also worked as a newspaper editor and journalist with the Bangor Daily News from 1961 to 1998.

References

1942 births
Living people
People from Brewer, Maine
Maine Independents
People from Winterport, Maine
Members of the Maine House of Representatives
Journalists from Maine